Baburao Chinchansur is an Indian politician from the state of Karnataka who served as the  Minister of Textiles, Ports & Inland Transport of Karnataka from 2013 to 2016. He is a five term member of the Karnataka Legislative Assembly representing Gurmitkal for three terms and Chittapur for two terms.

Early life
Chinchansur was born to Basavannappa Chinchansur and hails from Koli community of Gulbarga in Karnataka. He did his Master of Arts from Mysore University.

Political party
He was from the Bharatiya Janata Party which he resigned on 20 Mar 2023.

Ministry
He was the Minister for Textiles Ports & Inland Transport K. Siddaramaiah led Indian National Congress Karnataka Government.

Controversy
A woman had alleged that the minister borrowed Rs 11.88 crore from her in 2011, but has not returned it.

References 

Koli people

External links 
 Karnataka Legislative Assembly

Living people
Karnataka MLAs 2008–2013
Indian National Congress politicians from Karnataka
People from Yadgir district
Year of birth missing (living people)
Bharatiya Janata Party politicians from Karnataka